Did You Hear the One About the Traveling Saleslady? is a 1968 American comedy film directed by Don Weis and written by John Fenton Murray. The film stars Phyllis Diller, Bob Denver, Joe Flynn, Eileen Wesson, Jeanette Nolan, Paul Reed, Bob Hastings and David Hartman. The film was released on July 14, 1968, by Universal Pictures.

Plot
Missouri, 1910: In town trying to sell player pianos, traveling saleslady Agatha Knabenshu doesn't have much luck. She lends $1,000 to struggling inventor Bertram Webb, whose new invention, a cow-milking machine, promptly causes $1,500 in damages.

With heartless banker Hubert Shelton about to foreclose on the Webb family's home, Bert has one last hope, a wood-burning automobile that he's created. At an auto race with a $1,500 first prize, Bert is unable to drive, so Agatha gets behind the wheel in his place and wins the race.

Cast 
Phyllis Diller as Agatha Knabenshu
Bob Denver as Bertram Webb
Joe Flynn as Hubert Shelton
Eileen Wesson as Jeanine Morse
Jeanette Nolan as Ma Webb
Paul Reed as Pa Webb
Bob Hastings as Lyle Chatterton
David Hartman as Constable
George N. Neise as Ben Milford
Anita Eubank as Young Girl
Kelly Thordsen as Enoch Scraggs
Jane Dulo as Clara Buxton
Charles Lane as Mr. Duckworth
Dallas McKennon as Old Soldier
Herb Vigran as Baggage Man
Lloyd Kino as Laundrey Man
Warde Donovan as Salesman
Eddie Quillan as Salesman
Eddie Ness as Salesman

References

External links
 
 

1968 films
1968 comedy films
American comedy films
Films directed by Don Weis
Films scored by Vic Mizzy
Films set in Kansas
Films set in Missouri
Films set in 1910
Universal Pictures films
1960s English-language films
1960s American films